El padre Guernica, is a Mexican telenovela produced by Televisa and originally transmitted by Telesistema Mexicano.

Cast 
Juan Carlos Ruiz
Demetrio González
Carmen Salas
Manolita Saval

References

External links 

Mexican telenovelas
Televisa telenovelas
Spanish-language telenovelas
1968 telenovelas
1968 Mexican television series debuts
1968 Mexican television series endings